Snethlage may refer to:

 Edu Snethlage (1883–1941), Dutch association football player
 Emilie Snethlage (1868–1929), German-born Brazilian naturalist and ornithologist
 Bernhard Moritz Snethlage (1753–1840), German educator

See also

 Snethlage's antpitta, a species of antpitta in the family Grallariidae
 Snethlage's tody-tyrant, a species of bird in the family Tyrannidae
 Chestnut-belted gnateater, also known as Snethlage's gnateater, a species of bird in the family Conopophagidae
 Emilia's marmoset, also known as Snethlage's marmoset, a marmoset endemic to Brazil